Medal of Honor: Heroes is a first-person shooter video game developed by Canadian studio Team Fusion for the PlayStation Portable, and is the ninth installment in the Medal of Honor series. It was released on October 23, 2006 in North America.

Plot
The player takes the role of various heroes from the Medal of Honor series. There are three different campaigns, each with its own hero that spearheads squads to complete objectives. These heroes are: Lieutenant Jimmy Patterson, who was the star of the original Medal of Honor and Medal of Honor: Frontline, Sergeant John Baker from Medal of Honor: Allied Assault Breakthrough, and Lt. William Holt from Medal of Honor: European Assault. The campaigns take place in Italy, the Netherlands, and Belgium.

After the player beats the Battle of the Bulge in Belgium, they are treated to the end cinematic. It shows that Patterson proposed to Manon, but the mission briefer adds that a response has not been reported yet.

Gameplay
Objectives include sabotage, infiltration, capturing certain objectives. Most missions in each campaign include the player blowing something up, killing a certain number of enemies, stealing enemy intel, and then sometimes returning to a certain location to escape. There are three different levels to be attained in each level: bronze, silver and gold. To score bronze, the player must complete all primary objectives. To score silver, the player must complete the primary and secondary objectives. Gold is the same as silver but the player must have high accuracy and kills. Obtaining these different levels increases the player's rank and helps the player complete the game to 100%. Through gameplay, players may unlock skins to use in multiplayer and skirmish mode.

Multiplayer
Heroes features an online multiplayer that allows for 32 players in a match. It also lets the player access real weapons. These include the M1 Garand, Thompson submachine gun, M1911 pistol, and bazooka. Gameplay modes include Deathmatch, Infiltration, Demolition, Hold the Line, Battlelines, and Domination. Unlike most other online multiplayer games, no points are awarded even if the player successfully brings an enemy flag back to the base and scores. The game also has a ranking system that gives players' ranks by their kill-death ratios. It also has a top 100 leaderboard and the ranking system goes to 10,000-1. The online servers shut down on August 11, 2011.

Online multiplayer is still an option with the use of XLink Kai or adhoc Party, the software that connects all players worldwide, assuming they have a wireless router.

Reception

The game received "average" reviews according to video game review aggregator Metacritic.

References

External links

2006 video games
Electronic Arts games
Multiplayer online games
PlayStation Portable games
PlayStation Portable-only games
Heroes
Video games developed in Canada
Video games set in Belgium
Video games set in Italy
Video games set in the Netherlands
World War II video games
Video games using Havok